Walking on a Wire may refer to:

Walking on a Wire, album by Lowen & Navarro 1990
Walking on a Wire, album by Skipper Wise
Walking on a Wire 1968-2009,  4-CD compilation album by Richard Thompson
"Walking on a Wire", song by Amy Holland Light On My Path
"Walking on a Wire", song by  The Get Up Kids On a Wire
"Walking on a Wire", song by Lost Lander